David Gilford (born 14 September 1965) is an English professional golfer.

Gilford was born in Crewe. In 1981, aged just 15, he won the Carris Trophy, English Boys Under-18 Open Amateur Stroke-Play Championship, at Moor Park. He won the English Amateur in 1984 and turned professional in 1986.

Gilford has six wins on the European Tour, all of which came between 1991 and 1994. He finished in the top ten of the European Tour Order of Merit twice, placing 9th in 1991 and 7th in 1994. He played in the Ryder Cup in 1991 and 1995.

After reaching 50, Gilford played on the European Senior Tour, playing his first event in late 2015. His best finish came in just his second event, in June 2016, when he finished third in the SSE Enterprise Wales Senior Open after a final round 64.

Amateur wins
1981 Carris Trophy
1984 English Amateur
1986 Lagonda Trophy, British Youths Open Amateur Championship

Professional wins (6)

European Tour wins (6)

European Tour playoff record (2–1)

Results in major championships

CUT = missed the half-way cut (3rd round cut in 1985 Open Championship)
"T" = tied

Summary

Most consecutive cuts made – 3 (1994 Open Championship – 1995 Masters)
Longest streak of top-10s – 0

Team appearances
Amateur
Jacques Léglise Trophy (representing Great Britain & Ireland): 1982 (winners)
European Youths' Team Championship (representing England): 1984
Eisenhower Trophy (representing Great Britain & Ireland): 1984
European Amateur Team Championship (representing England): 1985
Walker Cup (representing Great Britain & Ireland): 1985
St Andrews Trophy (representing Great Britain & Ireland): 1986 (winners)

Professional
Ryder Cup (representing Europe): 1991, 1995 (winners)
Dunhill Cup (representing England): 1992 (winners)
World Cup (representing England): 1992, 1993

References

External links

English male golfers
European Tour golfers
Ryder Cup competitors for Europe
Sportspeople from Crewe
People from Market Drayton
1965 births
Living people